Shinaakht (meaning Identification) is an Indian Hindi-language short film directed, written and produced by Pragyesh Singh under the banner of TNV Films. The film stars Raju Kher, Shishir Sharma, Shakti Singh, Navni Parihar, Arfi Lamba, Stefy Patel, Bikramjeet Kanwarpal and Krishna Bhatt. The film is based on Circumcision which challenges Male genital mutilation (MGM) and Female genital mutilation (FGM) as per Islamic Law.

Shinaakht premiered in Gorakhpur, Hisar, Raipur, Jamshedpur, Allahabad, as part of the Jagran Film Festival in August and September 2019.

The film has been selected and screened in the several National and International film festivals including Crownwood International Film Festival, Delhi Film Festival, Apulia Web Fest, Italy KinoDUEL International Film Festival, England, International Short Film Festival Pune Films Infest (New York City), L'Age d'Or International Art-house Film Festival and Ploiesti International Film Festival, Romania.

Plot 
The story of the film shows a close relationship between a father named Liaqat Ali (Shishir Sharma) and his two kids named Idrish (son, played by Arfi Lamba) and Sofiya (daughter, played by Stefy Patel). As per the religious customs in Islam, both were circumcised at the age of 8 and 9 as respectively. On attaining Adult age, Idrish (Arfi Lamba) and Sofiya (Stefy Patel) filed a case against their father, Liaqat Ali (Shishir Sharma), Maulvi Muhammad Basheer (Raju Kher) and Zarra Jumman Miyan, an illiterate, who performed circumcisions. The case was registered as per the provision of the Indian Medical Council Act, 1956, the Protection of Children from Sexual Offences (POCSO) Act, 2012 and Section 326 and 326A of the Indian Penal Code. When matters were brought to the Mumbai High Court, Liaqat Ali (Shishir Sharma) took their children's side and supported them and the Constitutional laws of India.

Liaqat Ali (Shishir Sharma) was not willing to undergo the circumcision of his children but he was pressurised by Maulana Muhammad Basheer, who explained Liaqat Ali (Shishir Sharma) that it is mandatory for Muslims to undergo circumcision or else they cannot be treated as Muslims. Liaqat realised that it was his fault when he faces the facts that circumcision was carried out in medically unhygienic conditions by an unprofessional person, which affected the kids seriously and they suffered from health issues. Later, Liaqat learns that circumcision as identification of religion is nowhere mentioned in the holy book Quran and found that it isn't a mandatory practice as per the religion.

Cast 
 Raju Kher as Maulvi Sahab
 Shishir Sharma as Liaqat Ali
 Shakti Singh as Prosecutor
 Navni Parihar as Razia
 Arfi Lamba as Idrish
 Stefy Patel as Sofiya
 Bikramjeet Kanwarpal as Syed Qadri
 Krishna Bhatt as Jumman Miya
 Rajendra Mehra as Senior Maulana

Accolades

See also

 List of Hindi films
 Female genital mutilation in India
 Circumcision in Islam
 List of films about women's issues
 Genital modification and mutilation

References

External links 
 
 

2018 films
2010s Hindi-language films
Works about female genital mutilation